The list of shipwrecks in 1958 includes ships sunk, foundered, grounded, or otherwise lost during 1958.

January

4 January

6 January

9 January

13 January

16 Januaary

21 January

27 January

29 January

31 January

February

4 February

16 February

19 February

25 February

26 February

March

1 March

2 March

9 March

10 March

14 March

19 March

27 March

28 March

31 March

April

6 April

20 April

28 April

28 or 30 April
These two ships were bombed in an air raid or raids on Ambon Bay in Indonesia. Ambon was bombed several times, and sources differ as to the date(s) on which the ships were attacked. One source suggests that they were hit on 1 or 2 May.

29 April

May

1 May

2 May

8 May

12 May

13 May

14 May

17 May

22 May

29 May

31 May

June

3 June

6 June

8 June

16 June

17 June

20 June

25 June

26 June

July

1 July

6 July

9 July

14 July

24 July

August

5 August

7 August

8 August

11 August

14 August

15 August

21 August

22 August

24 August

26 August

September

2 September

5 September

8 September

10 September

13 September

17 September

18 September

19 September

24 September

26 September

October

5 October

5 October

6 October

21 October

22 October

23 October

31 October

Unknown October

November

2 November

3 November

13 November

16 November

18 November

22 November

23 November

December

1 December

3 December

5 December

10 December

14 December

15 December

17 December

18 December

20 December

23 December

28 December

30 December

31 December

Unknown December

Unknown date

References

See also 

1958
 
Ships